Royston Anthony Smith (born 14 March 1974) is an English cricketer.  Smith is a right-handed batsman who bowls right-arm medium pace.  He was born in Romford, London.

Smith represented the Essex Cricket Board in 3 List A matches.  These came against Warwickshire in the 2000 NatWest Trophy, Suffolk in the 2001 Cheltenham & Gloucester Trophy and the Surrey Cricket Board in the 2nd round of the 2003 Cheltenham & Gloucester Trophy which was played in 2002.  In his 3 List A matches, he scored 27 runs at a batting average of 9.00, with a high score of 11.  In the field he took a single catch.

He currently plays club cricket for Ardleigh Green Cricket Club in the Essex Premier League.

References

External links
Royston Smith at Cricinfo
Royston Smith at CricketArchive

1974 births
Living people
People from Romford
Cricketers from Greater London
English cricketers
Essex Cricket Board cricketers